Tom Broster (6 October 1878 – 19 May 1942) was a Cape Colony cricketer. He played in two first-class matches for Border in 1902/03.

See also
 List of Border representative cricketers

References

External links
 

1878 births
1942 deaths
Cricketers from Cape Colony
Emigrants from the United Kingdom to Cape Colony
Border cricketers
Sportspeople from Wrexham